Aviad Raz is an Israeli professor of sociology. He is director of the  Behavioral Sciences program of the Department of Sociology and Anthropology at Ben-Gurion University of the Negev.

Academic career
Aviad Raz earned his B.Sc. and Ph.D. from Tel-Aviv University. He was a Post-doctoral Fellow at Harvard and held fellowships from the Japan Foundation and the Israeli Academy of Sciences. His research focuses on religious/ethnic groups and identities in contemporary Israeli society, especially in the context of health and family studies. He studies the social and bioethical aspects of medical organizations, community genetics and patient support organizations. He also conducts research in the fields of organizational culture and cross-cultural management, and organizational development.

Raz has written seven books and over 43 articles and book chapters on topics in organizational and medical sociology, anthropology, culture, and science.

Aviad Raz was a Visiting AICE Professor at the Dept. of Sociology, University of California in San Diego in 2012-13.

Published works
 Riding the Black Ship: Japan and Tokyo Disneyland,  Harvard University Press (1999).  
 Emotions at Work: Normative Control, Organizations, and Culture in Japan and America,  Harvard University Press (2002). 
 Organizational culture, The Open University of Israel (2004)
 The Gene And The Genie: Tradition, Medicalization, and Genetic Counseling in a Bedouin Community in Israel,  Carolina Academic Press (2005).  
 Community Genetics and Genetic Alliances (Genetics and Society),  Routledge (2009).

References

Israeli sociologists
Academic staff of Tel Aviv University
Academic staff of Ben-Gurion University of the Negev
Living people
Tel Aviv University alumni
Year of birth missing (living people)